Mound Township is one of twenty-four townships in Bates County, Missouri, and is part of the Kansas City metropolitan area within the USA.  As of the 2000 census, its population was 819.

Mound Township was named for the mounds within its borders.

Geography
According to the United States Census Bureau, Mound Township covers an area of 36.23 square miles (93.82 square kilometers); of this, 36.13 square miles (93.59 square kilometers, 99.75 percent) is land and 0.09 square miles (0.23 square kilometers, 0.25 percent) is water.

Cities, towns, villages
 Adrian (partial)
 Passaic

Adjacent townships
 Deer Creek Township (north)
 Grand River Township (northeast)
 Shawnee Township (east)
 Summit Township (southeast)
 Mount Pleasant Township (south)
 Charlotte Township (southwest)
 Elkhart Township (west)
 East Boone Township (northwest)

Major highways
  U.S. Route 71

Landmarks
 City Park
 Grove Street

School districts
 Adrian County R-III
 Butler R-V School District

Political districts
 Missouri's 4th congressional district
 State House District 125
 State Senate District 31

References
 United States Census Bureau 2008 TIGER/Line Shapefiles
 United States Board on Geographic Names (GNIS)
 United States National Atlas

External links
 US-Counties.com
 City-Data.com

Townships in Bates County, Missouri
Townships in Missouri